Bharatpur Lok Sabha constituency is one of the 25 Lok Sabha (parliamentary) constituencies in Rajasthan state in India.

Assembly segments
Presently, Bharatpur Lok Sabha constituency comprises eight Vidhan Sabha (legislative assembly) segments. These are:

Members of Lok Sabha

Election results

2019

2014

2009

See also
 Bharatpur district
 List of Constituencies of the Lok Sabha

Notes

External links
Bharatpur lok sabha  constituency election 2019 result details

Lok Sabha constituencies in Rajasthan
Bharatpur district